Flaveria sonorensis is a rare Mexican plant species of Flaveria within the family Asteraceae. It has been found only in southern Sonora and southwestern Chihuahua in northwestern Mexico. Some of the populations lie very close to hot mineral springs.

One plant will produce numerous small flower heads in flat-topped clusters, each head with 5-7 disc flowers and sometimes a single ray flower.

References 

sonorensis
Flora of Sonora
Flora of Chihuahua (state)
Endemic flora of Mexico
Plants described in 1978